Naor Shiri (born 1 May 1985) is an Israeli politician who currently serves as a member of the Knesset for Yesh Atid.

Biography
Shiri was placed forth-sixth on the Yesh Atid list for the 2015 Knesset elections, but was not elected. He was forty-eighth on the joint Blue and White list for the April 2019 elections, but again missed out.

Prior to the 2022 Knesset elections he was placed twenty-fourth on the Yesh Atid list, and was elected to the Knesset as the party won 24 seats.

References

External links

1985 births
Living people
Jewish Israeli politicians
Members of the 25th Knesset (2022–)
Yesh Atid politicians